Events from the year 1961 in the United States.

Incumbents

Federal Government 
 President: Dwight D. Eisenhower (R-Kansas/Pennsylvania) (until January 20), John F. Kennedy (D-Massachusetts) (starting January 20)
 Vice President: Richard Nixon (R-California) (until January 20), Lyndon B. Johnson (D-Texas) (starting January 20)
 Chief Justice: Earl Warren (California)
 Speaker of the House of Representatives: Sam Rayburn (D-Texas) (until November 16), vacant (starting November 16)
 Senate Majority Leader: Lyndon B. Johnson (D-Texas) (until January 3), Mike Mansfield (D-Montana) (starting January 3)
 Congress: 86th (until January 3), 87th (starting January 3)

Events

January–March

 January 3 
President Dwight Eisenhower announces that the United States has severed diplomatic and consular relations with Cuba.
At the National Reactor Testing Station near Idaho Falls, Idaho, atomic reactor SL-1 explodes, killing 3 military technicians.
 January 5 – Italian sculptor Alfredo Fioravanti marches into the U.S. Consulate in Rome, and confesses that he was part of the team that forged the Etruscan terracotta warriors in the Metropolitan Museum of Art.
 January 17 – President Dwight Eisenhower gives his Farewell Address, he warns of the increasing power of a "military-industrial complex".
 January 20 – John F. Kennedy is sworn in as the 35th President of the United States, and Lyndon B. Johnson is sworn in as Vice President of the United States.
 January 24
A U.S. B-52 Stratofortress, with two nuclear bombs, crashes near Goldsboro, North Carolina.
Musician Bob Dylan reportedly makes his way to New York City after bumming a ride in Madison, Wisconsin. Dylan is likely on his way to visit his idol Woody Guthrie. He later finds fame in the Greenwich Village protest folk music scene.
 January 25 
In Washington, D.C. John F. Kennedy delivers the first live presidential news conference. In it, he announces that the Soviet Union has freed the 2 surviving crewmen of a USAF RB-47 reconnaissance plane shot down by Soviet flyers over the Barents Sea July 1, 1960 (see RB-47H shot down).
One Hundred and One Dalmatians, Walt Disney's 17th animated feature film, is released, its financial success pulling the studio out of another financial slump from the initial underperformance of Sleeping Beauty.
 January 26 – John F. Kennedy appoints Janet G. Travell to be his physician, the first woman to hold this appointment.
 January 30 – President John F. Kennedy delivers his first State of the Union Address.
 January 31 – Ham, a 37-pound (17-kg) male chimpanzee, is rocketed into space aboard Mercury-Redstone 2, in a test of the Project Mercury capsule, designed to carry United States astronauts into space.
 February 1 – The United States launches its first test of the Minuteman I intercontinental ballistic missile.
 February 14 – Discovery of the chemical elements: Element 103, Lawrencium, is first synthesized in Berkeley, California.
 February 15 
President Kennedy warns the Soviet Union to avoid interfering with the United Nations pacification of the Congo.
A Sabena Boeing 707 crashes near Brussels, Belgium, killing 73, including the entire United States figure skating team and several coaches.
 March 1 – President of the United States John F. Kennedy establishes the Peace Corps.
 March 8 – The first U.S. Polaris submarines arrive at Holy Loch.
 March 13
United States delegate to the United Nations Security Council Adlai Stevenson votes against Portuguese policies in Africa.
President of the United States John F. Kennedy proposes a long-term "Alliance for Progress" between the United States and Latin America.
 March 29 – The Twenty-third Amendment to the United States Constitution is ratified, allowing residents of Washington, D.C. to vote in presidential elections.
 March 30 – The Single Convention on Narcotic Drugs is signed at New York City.

April–June

 April 17 
The Bay of Pigs Invasion of Cuba begins; it fails by April 19.
The 33rd Academy Awards ceremony, hosted by Bob Hope, is held at Santa Monica Civic Auditorium. Billy Wilder's The Apartment wins and receives the most respective awards and nominations with five and ten, winning Best Motion Picture and Best Director for Wilder. It is the last black-and-white film to win for Best Picture until 1993.
 April 23 – Judy Garland performs in a legendary comeback concert at Carnegie Hall in New York City.
 April 27 – President Kennedy delivers a revealing speech: The President and the Press: Address before the American Newspaper Publishers Association.
 May 4 – U.S. Freedom Riders begin interstate bus rides to test the new U.S. Supreme Court integration decision.
 May 5 – Mercury program: Alan Shepard becomes the first American in space aboard Mercury-Redstone 3.
 May 9 – In a speech on "Television and the Public Interest" to the National Association of Broadcasters, FCC chairman Newton N. Minow describes commercial television programming as a "vast wasteland".
 May 14 – American civil rights movement: A Freedom Riders bus is fire-bombed near Anniston, Alabama and the civil rights protestors are beaten by an angry mob of Ku Klux Klan members.
 May 21 – American civil rights movement: Alabama Governor John Patterson declares martial law in an attempt to restore order after race riots break out.
 May 24 – American civil rights movement: Freedom Riders are arrested in Jackson, Mississippi for "disturbing the peace" after disembarking from their bus.
 May 25 – Apollo program: President Kennedy announces before a special joint session of Congress his goal to put a man on the Moon before the end of the decade.
 May 31 – President John F. Kennedy and French President Charles De Gaulle meet in Paris, France.
 June 4 – Vienna summit: John F. Kennedy and Nikita Khrushchev meet during two days in Vienna. They discuss nuclear tests, disarmament and Germany.

July–September
 July 21 – Mercury program: Gus Grissom, piloting the Mercury-Redstone 4 capsule Liberty Bell 7, becomes the second American to go into space (sub-orbital). Upon splashdown, the hatch prematurely opens, and the capsule sinks (it is recovered in 1999).
 July 31 – At Fenway Park in Boston, Massachusetts, the first All-Star Game tie in major league baseball history occurs, when the game is stopped in the 9th inning due to rain (the only tie until 2002 in MLB All-Star Game history).
 August – USA founds Alliance for Progress.
 August 5 – The Six Flags over Texas theme park officially opens to the public.
 August 7 – Cape Cod National Seashore is established.
 September 7 – Tom and Jerry make a return with their first episode since 1958, Switchin' Kitten.
 September 17 – The world's first retractable roof stadium, the Civic Arena, opens in Pittsburgh, Pennsylvania.
 September 24 – The Walt Disney anthology television series, renamed Walt Disney's Wonderful World of Color, moves from ABC to NBC after seven years on the air, and begins telecasting its programs in color for the first time.
 September 25 – Black voting rights activist Herbert Lee is murdered by Mississippi state representative E. H. Hurst.

October–December
 October 1 – Baseball player Roger Maris of the New York Yankees hits his 61st home run in the last game of the season, against the Boston Red Sox, beating the 34-year-old record held by Babe Ruth.
 October 9 – The New York Yankees defeat the Cincinnati Reds, 4 games to 1, to win their 19th World Series Title.
 October 27 – A standoff between Soviet and American tanks in Berlin, Germany heightens Cold War tensions.
 November – The Fantastic Four #1 comic debuts, launching the Marvel Universe and revolutionizing the American comic book industry.
 November 2 – Kean opens at Broadway Theater in New York City for 92 performances.
 November 6 – The U.S. government issues a stamp honoring the one-hundredth birthday of James Naismith.
 November 9 – Robert M. White records a world record speed in a rocket plane of 6,585 km/h flying an X-15.
 November 17 – Michael Rockefeller, son of New York Governor, and later Vice President Nelson Rockefeller, disappears in the jungles of New Guinea.
 November 18 – U.S. President John F. Kennedy sends 18,000 military advisors to South Vietnam.
 November 20 – The funeral of longtime House Speaker Sam Rayburn is held in Washington, D.C. Two former Presidents (Truman, Eisenhower) and one future one (Lyndon B. Johnson) join President Kennedy in paying their respects.
 December 5 – U.S. President John F. Kennedy gives support to the Volta Dam project in Ghana.
 December 11 – The Vietnam War officially begins, as the first American helicopters arrive in Saigon along with 400 U.S. personnel.

Ongoing
 Cold War (1947–1991)
 Space Race (1957–1975)
 Vietnam War (1955-1975)

Sport 
 April 16 - Chicago Black Hawks win their third (and last until 2010) Stanley Cup by defeating the Detroit Red Wings 4 games to 2; the deciding game is played at Olympia Stadium in Detroit.

Births
 January 2 
 Gabrielle Carteris, actress and trade union leader 
 Todd Haynes, director and screenwriter
 January 4 
Lee Curreri, actor and pianist
Sidney Green, basketball player and coach
 January 7 – John Thune, U.S. Senator from South Dakota from 2005
 January 5 – Iris DeMent, singer-songwriter
 January 9
 Al Jean, animator and television writer
 Candi Milo, actress
 Oliver Goldstick, screenwriter and producer
 January 10 
 Evan Handler, actor
 Janet Jones, actress 
 January 13
 Wayne Coyne, musician, frontman of The Flaming Lips
 Julia Louis-Dreyfus, actress, producer and comedian
 Rich Fields, announcer and weather reporter
 January 15 – Leni Wylliams, dancer/choreographer/master-teacher (died 1996)
 January 18 – Bob Peterson, animator and voice actor
 January 19 – William Ragsdale, actor
 January 22
 Quintin Dailey, basketball player (died 2010)
 Daniel Johnston, musician (died 2019)
 January 29 – Mike Aldrete, baseball player and coach 
 January 30 – Dexter King, social activist, son of Martin Luther King Jr.
 February 2 – Michael Kay, sportscaster
 February 4 – Stewart O'Nan, novelist 
 February 8 – Vince Neil, singer
 February 9 – John Kruk, baseball player and commentator
 February 10 – George Stephanopoulos, political consultant and commentator 
 February 12 – David Graeber, anthropologist, anarchist activist and author (died 2020)
 February 17 – Chris Champion, wrestler (died 2018)
 March 4 
Ray Mancini, boxer
Steven Weber, actor, producer, and screenwriter
 March 6 – John Blake, American football coach (died 2020)
 March 14 – Gary Dell'Abate, radio producer, best known for his work on The Howard Stern Show
 March 25 – Reggie Fils-Aimé, president of Nintendo of America
 April 2 – Christopher Meloni, actor
 April 3 – Eddie Murphy, actor
 April 10 
 Mark Jones, basketball player
 Quency Williams, football player (died 2022 in Canada)
 April 14 – Daniel Clowes, cartoonist and screenwriter
 April 17 – Rebecca Luker, actress and singer (died 2020)
 April 20 – Mike Pniewski, actor and public speaker
 April 26 – Chris Mars, singer-songwriter, drummer and producer 
 May 3
 David Vitter, U.S. Senator from Louisiana from 2005 to 2017
 Joe Murray, animator, writer, illustrator, producer, director, and voice actor
 May 6
 George Clooney, actor, film director, producer and screenwriter
 Wally Wingert, voice actor and radio personality
 May 8 – Bill de Blasio, politician, Mayor of New York City from 2014
 May 12 
Paul Begala, journalist and academic
Lar Park Lincoln, actress
Jerry Trimble, actor and stuntman
 May 31 – Lea Thompson, actress and director
 June 5 – Mary Kay Bergman, voice actress (died 1999)
 July 6 – Robin Antin, American dancer, choreographer, and businesswoman
 July 7 – Eric Jerome Dickey, author (died 2021)
 July 14 – Jackie Earle Haley, actor
 July 15 – Scott Ritter, soldier and international weapons inspector
 July 23 – Woody Harrelson, actor and playwright
 August 4 – Barack Obama, 44th President of the United States from 2009 to 2017
 August 5 – Tawny Kitaen, actress and model (died 2021)
 August 9 – Amy Stiller, actress, daughter of Jerry Stiller and Anne Meara and sister of Ben Stiller
 August 21 – Stephen Hillenburg, marine biologist, cartoonist (died 2018)
 August 25 – Billy Ray Cyrus, singer
 August 25 – Jennifer Coolidge, actress
 September 9 – Jim Corsi, baseball player (died 2022)
 September 11 – E.G. Daily, actress, voice actress and singer
 September 23 – Chi McBride, actor
 September 25 – Frankie Randall, boxer, welterweight world champion (died 2020)
 October 5
 David Bryson, guitarist and singer-songwriter
 Sharon Cheslow, singer-songwriter and guitarist 
 October 10 – Jodi Benson, actress and singer
 October 26 – Dylan McDermott, actor
 October 28 – Derek Bunch,  former NFL linebacker
 October 29 – Randy Jackson, Younger brother of Michael Jackson and member of the Jackson 5. 
 November 1 – Ryan Zinke, 52nd United States Secretary of the Interior
 November 17 
 Pat Toomey, U.S. Senator from Pennsylvania from 2011 to 2023.
 Robert Stethem, U.S. Navy Seabee diver murdered by Hezbollah terrorists during the hijacking of TWA Flight 847 (killed 1985)
 November 18 – Gwen Knapp, sports journalist (died 2023)
 November 20
 Jim Brickman, singer-songwriter and pianist
 Phil Joanou, TV director
 November 22
 Mariel Hemingway, actress and sister of Margaux Hemingway
 John Schnatter, entrepreneur and the founder of Papa John's Pizza 
 November 29 – Tom Sizemore, actor (died 2023)
 December 8 – Ann Coulter, political commentator
 December 9 – Joe Lando, actor
 December 12 – Jack Ciattarelli, politician
 December 22 – Andrew Fastow, businessman
 December 24 – Mary Barra, CEO of General Motors
 December 30 – Sean Hannity, talk show host

Deaths
January 9 – Emily Greene Balch, writer, pacifist and winner of the Nobel Peace Prize in 1946 (born 1867)
January 19 – Nathaniel Baldwin, inventor and Mormon fundamentalist (born 1878)
January 29 – John F. O'Ryan, soldier, lawyer and politician (born 1874)
February 3 – Anna May Wong, film actress (born 1905)
May 8 – Raymond DeWalt, inventor and businessman (born 1885) 
May 13 – Gary Cooper, American actor (High Noon) (born 1901)
May 16 –  George A. Malcolm, jurist and educator (born 1881)
May 19 – Grace George, actress (born 1879)
June 1  – Melvin Jones, founder of Lions Clubs International (born 1879)
June 17 – Jeff Chandler, actor (born 1918)
July 2 – Ernest Hemingway, fiction writer, journalist and winner of the Pulitzer Prize for The Old Man and the Sea (born 1899)
September 3 – Fay-Cooper Cole, anthropologist (born 1881)
September 10 – Leo Carrillo, actor (born 1880)
September 11 – George Irving, actor (born 1874)
September 23 – John Eldredge, actor (born 1904)
September 25 – Frank Fay, actor (born 1897)
October 31 – Jim Aiken, football and basketball player and coach (born 1899)
December 25 – Otto Loewi, pharmacologist (born 1873 in Germany)
December 28 – Edith Wilson, First Lady of the United States (born 1872)

See also
 List of American films of 1961
 Timeline of United States history (1950–1969)

References

External links
 

 
1960s in the United States
United States
United States
Years of the 20th century in the United States